The Gun Fighter, on posters The Gunfighter, is a 1917 American silent Western film directed by and starring William S. Hart as the leader of a group of Arizona outlaws, and co-starred Margery Wilson and Roy Laidlaw.

Cast
 William S. Hart as Cliff Hudspeth
 Margery Wilson as Norma Wright
 Roy Laidlaw as El Salvador
 Joseph J. Dowling as 'Ace High' Larkins (credited as J.J. Dowling)
 Milton Ross as 'Cactus' Fuller
 J.P. Lockney as Col. Ellis Lawton
 Georgie Stone as Georgie Stone

References

External links

 
 
 The Gunfighter (1917): A Silent Film Review at moviessilently.com

1917 films
1917 Western (genre) films
American black-and-white films
Films set in Arizona
Silent American Western (genre) films
Films directed by William S. Hart
1910s American films
1910s English-language films